The 2011 CIS Men's University Cup Hockey Tournament (49th Annual) was held March 24–27, 2011. It was the first year of a two-year CIS Championship bid won by University of New Brunswick and hosted at their on-campus hockey rink - Aitken University Centre. The defending champions were St. Mary's Huskies, who won their 1st title in team history the previous year in Saskatoon. There would be a new champion this season as SMU was unsuccessful in advancing to the event.

Similar to previous years, going back to the introduction of the expanded format in 1998, the six invited teams were split into two(2) Pools of three(3) where each team plays the other(two games total). The best team in each Pool advances to the final. All pool games must be decided by a win, there are no ties. If a pool has a three-way tie for 1st (all teams have 1-1 records) than GF/GA differential among the tied teams is the first tie-breaker.

Road to the Cup

AUS playoffs

OUA Playoffs

Canada West playoffs

University Cup 
The six teams to advance to the tournament are listed below. The wild-card team was selected from the CW Conference as the OUA was provided the wild-card in 2010 and AUS teams are ineligible as they are the host conference. To avoid having St.FX in the same pool as UNB and Western in the same pool as McGill, the two teams were swapped.

Pool A - Evening

Pool B - Afternoon

Championship final
Bench assignments for the championship final is based on each advancing team's record and stats in their 2 pool games, not their tournament seed. UNB was determined the home team with a record of 2-0 (4pts) and a GF/GA of 6/1 = 6.0 versus McGill with the same record but a GF/GA of 8/4 = 2.0.

Tournament All-Stars
Luke Gallant, a defenceman from the UNB Varsity Reds, was selected as the Major W.J. 'Danny' McLeod Award for CIS University Cup MVP. He led all players at the tournament with seven points (2+5=7) in three games including an assist on Josh Kidd's game-winning goal with 4.1 seconds remaining in a 2-1 victory over Calgary in their first game on Thursday. Plus back-to-back game-winners in a 4-0 shutout of Western on Saturday and a 4-0 victory of second-ranked McGill in Sunday's national final. Gallant earned Game-MVP honours against both Western and McGill following a pair of three-point performances.

Joining Gallant on the tournament all-star team were:
Forward: Kyle Bailey (UNB Varsity Reds)
Forward: Chris Culligan (UNB Varsity Reds)
Forward: Maxime Langelier-Parent (McGill Redmen)
Defenseman: Jonathan Harty (UNB Varsity Reds)
Goalie: Travis Fullerton (UNB Varsity Reds)

References

External links
 Tournament Website

U Sports ice hockey
University Cup, 2012